EAO asbl, operating as the European Association for Osseointegration (EAO) is a non-profit organisation founded in Munich in  to serve as an international, interdisciplinary and independent science-based forum for all professionals interested in the art and science of Osseointegration.

Its headquarters are in Ixelles, Brussels, Belgium.

References

External links
 EAO home page

See also

Osseointegration

Medical and health organisations based in Belgium
Organizations established in 1991
International organisations based in Belgium
Orthopedics journals
International medical associations of Europe
1991 establishments in Germany